Ammocharis longifolia is a species of bulbous plant in the family Amaryllidaceae. It has been placed as the only species, Cybistetes longifolia, in the monotypic genus Cybistetes.

Description 
Ammocharis longifolia is a perennial geophyte with large (100–150 mm) bulbs, 9–14 prostrate leaves, a 13–90 flowered inflorescence, flowers funnel-shaped, ivory or pale to dark pink, tepals connate forming a floral tube.

It is distinguished from other species of Ammocharis by the presence of zygomorphic flowers, as opposed to actinomorphic, and by its seed dispersal mechanism, with a wind blown indehiscent infructescence (fruiting head) that gave it its name. The fruiting head dries rapidly and is shed as a single unit, which the rolls away (tumbles), born by the wind. Another distinguishing feature in the infructescence is the pedicels, which elongate, spread apart, stiffen and ultimately radiate equally in all directions.

Taxonomy

History 
The taxon was originally described by Linnaeus in 1753 as Amaryllis longifolia, one of eight species in that genus, but was well known and cultivated in Europe long before that, Linnaeus basing his description on Paul Hermann's Paradisus Batavus (1698) as Lilium Africanum Polyanthos. Since then it has had a complicated history as detailed by Milne-Redhead and Schweickerdt, being variously placed in Crinum and Brunsvigia.

Cybistetes was one of three genera in subtribe Crininae and Cybistetes longifolia has been considered a synonym for Ammocharis longifolia in the closely related genus Ammocharis since 2007, and is treated as such by the World Checklist of Selected Plant Families. Prior to that it was treated as a separate genus by taxonomists in a Sister) relationship to Ammocharis. In that configuration the third genus of subtribe Crininae, Crinum was then in a sister relationship to the Cybistetes+Ammocharis clade.

Cybistetes was described by Milne-Redhead and Schweickerdt in 1939, and fairly consistently treated as a separate genus, being distinct from Ammocharis in both distribution and seed dispersal, and was grouped within Crininae by recircumscription of this subtribe in 2001, based on molecular phylogenetics. Milne-Redhead and Schweickerdt had segregated Cybistetes from Ammocharis largely on the basis of infructescence structure. For Cybistetes the entire infructescence of indehiscent fruits is the dispersal unit (anemogeochory ). By contrast Ammocharis fruits are dehiscent and infrutescence is lax. However Snijman and Linder (1996) had suggested, on morphological grounds alone that Cybistetes and Ammocharis be embedded in Crinum, there being insufficient synapomorphy to separate them, nevertheless they retained the distinction in their delineation of the subtribe (which incidentally contained Boophone). Although Germishuizen and Meyer embedded Cybistetes in Ammocharis in their original (2003) Plants of Southern Africa, the 2007 online version lists it separately.

Eventually a much more detailed study in 2007 with a greater sampling of Ammocharis showed that Cybistetes is indeed embedded in Ammocharis as A. longifolia, where it is sister to A. angolensis. Snijman and Kolberg (2011) provide a key to the entire genus of Ammocharis, including A. longifolia. There, it is distinguished from A. deserticola by its short perigone tube of only 8–15 mm long, relative to the latter (50–90 mm)

Distribution 
Southern Namibia and western Cape Province, which constitute the  extreme western region of winter rainfall in southern Africa.

References

Bibliography 

 
 
 
 
  (online version)

External links 

Amaryllidoideae